Lepidurus is a genus of small crustaceans in the order Notostraca (tadpole shrimp). It is the larger of the two extant genera of the tadpole shrimps, the other being Triops. They are commonly found in vernal pools and survive dry periods with the help of long lasting resting eggs. 

The genus contains the following species:
Lepidurus apus (Linnaeus, 1758)
Lepidurus arcticus (Pallas, 1793)
Lepidurus batesoni Longhurst, 1955
Lepidurus bilobatus Packard, 1883
Lepidurus couesii Packard, 1875
Lepidurus cryptus D. C. Rogers, 2001
Lepidurus lemmoni Holmes, 1894
Lepidurus mongolicus Vekhoff, 1992
Lepidurus packardi Simon, 1886

References

External links

Notostraca
Branchiopoda genera
Taxa named by William Elford Leach
Taxonomy articles created by Polbot